Turyol is a private ferry operator, which owns and operates urban and international ferry service in western Turkey, focused primarily around Istanbul. It is one of three private ferry operators in Istanbul, along with İDO and Dentur. Turyol maintains a fleet of 70 vessels, 60 of which are for scheduled passenger service. In terms of fleet size and number of lines, Turyol is the largest private ferry operator in Turkey and second largest overall, after the Istanbul Municipality's ferry operator Şehir Hatları.

Turyol operates ferry service within four separate areas in western Turkey. The largest of these four areas are in and around Istanbul, where Turyol operates commuter ferry service to 19 piers on the Bosporus, Golden Horn and Marmara Sea. Outside of the Istanbul area, Turyol operates international car ferry service from Turkey to two Greek islands: Lesbos and Chios. The ferry to Lesbos departs from Ayvalık, while the ferry to Chios departs from Çeşme. Season ferry service on the Gulf of İzmir between Foça, Mordoğan and Karaburun operates during the summer months.

Turyol operates a fleet of 70 vessels, along with 2 maintenance vessels for non-revenue service. 60 of these are for scheduled passenger service.

References

See also
İDO
Ferries in Istanbul

Transport in Istanbul
Ferry companies of Turkey
Companies based in Istanbul
Transport companies established in 1995
Turkish brands
1995 establishments in Turkey